Carsten Meyer-Heder (born 30 March 1961) is a German CDU politician and businessman.

Meyer-Heder founded the It-company team neusta. In March 2018, Meyer-Heder joined the Christian Democratic Union of Germany. On 26 May 2018, he was officially nominated as the CDU candidate for the office of the President of the Senate and Mayor of the Free Hanseatic City of Bremen in the 2019 Bremen state election. He gained 22.4% and could not reach power.

References

External links 
 

1961 births
Living people
Christian Democratic Union of Germany politicians
Politicians from Bremen (state)